Joaquin Avila is managing director of the global private equity firm, Carlyle Group, where he is responsible for researching and discovering opportunities in the field of buyout investments.

He holds a B.S. from Universidad Iberoamericana, a M.S. from Stanford University, and an MBA from Yale School of Management.

He was formerly a managing director and head of Latin America for the now defunct Lehman Brothers, where he concentrated on the development and implementation of regional strategic plans.  He has also worked for Banco Santander and Bankers Trust and was a board member of Unica, a Mexican venture capital firm. As managing director of Banco Santander, he was responsible for strategy development in Latin America and the acquisition of Banco Mexicano, the fourth largest bank in Mexico.

Avila also formed VAInvestments, a private equity firm based in Mexico which was financed by Banco Santander. In addition, he was a managing director of VA Investments/Compass Group, where he created strategic plans to develop private equity and asset management businesses in Mexico.

He is also a member of EMX capital, for investment in Mexico.

He was on a panel: "Exits in emerging markets" at the 2008 Emerging Markets Private Equity Forum.

References

Year of birth missing (living people)
Living people
Mexican money managers
Yale School of Management alumni
Stanford University alumni
Mexican financial businesspeople
Private equity and venture capital investors
The Carlyle Group people
Universidad Iberoamericana alumni